The Midnight Oil is the second solo studio album released by American country singer Barbara Mandrell, released in 1973.

Mandrell had not released a solo studio album since 1971. It was her most successful album while under her Columbia label. This album brought Mandrell into more controversial territory, especially with the title track, "The Midnight Oil" which discussed a woman cheating on her husband. The album spawned five Top 40 Country hits, "Tonight My Baby's Coming Home" (#10), "Show Me" (#11), "Holdin' On (To the Love I Got)" (#27), "Give a Little, Take a Little" (#24), and the title track (#7). This album brought Mandrell's first pair of solo Top 10 hits on the Hot Country Singles & Tracks chart. The album consisted of 11 tracks, some of which were cover versions, including Tanya Tucker's "Jamestown Ferry", Martha Carson's "Satisfied" and the George Jones and Tammy Wynette hit, "We're Gonna Hold On". The album peaked at #8 on the Top Country Albums chart in 1974.

Track listing

Charts

Weekly charts

Year-end charts

Singles

References

1973 albums
Barbara Mandrell albums
Albums produced by Billy Sherrill
Columbia Records albums